Gianmario Pagano is an Italian screenwriter, presbyter and teacher.

Biography 
He was ordained priest of the Catholic Church on May 16, 1987. He obtained the Bachelor's degree in Theology and philosophy, the Licentiate degree in Sacred Scripture at the Pontifical Biblical Institute, in 2009 the Master's Degree in Philosophy of Science at the Pontifical Lateran University and in 2017 the Master's Degree in Philosophical Aesthetics at the University of Rome La Sapienza.

He is collaborator in the company Lux Vide of Ettore Bernabei, from 1994 to 2001 is a consultant, producer, screenwriter for the television series Bible Collection (international co-production Lube, RAI, TNT, CBS), winner of the Emmy Award in 1995.

Gianmario Pagano's activity is closely related to the phenomenon of Italian religious and pedagogical fiction of the second half of the 90s, which was aimed at conveying significant, and therefore also religious, content with professionalism and competence; this kind of fiction represented an alternative to the dominant style of telenovelas.

In 2007 he wrote the libretto of The Divine Comedy, with subtitle: "The man seeking love", for the composer Marco Frisina, a musical opera inspired by Dante Alighieri's poem. In the same year he also wrote the screenplay Maria Montessori – Una vita per i bambini which won the award for best screenplay for Italian TV movies at Roma Fiction Fest 2007.

He is teacher of Religion at the high school in Rome (Liceo Scientifico e delle Scienze Umane Statale "Teresa Gullace Talotta" and the Liceo Artistico "Rossellini"). In 2016, he launched the YouTube channel Bella, prof!, a blog and a Facebook page with the aim of maintaining relationships with his former students. The initial project of the channel develops getting the attention of a wider audience, however Pagano's goal is always the same: "...to help those who are interested in understanding what they believe in or, often, what they do not believe in".

Filmography 
 Jeremiah, film TV, RAI 1, 1998
 Jesus, television film (co-producer), Emmy Award Nomination Outstanding miniseries 2000
 San Paolo, television film, Lux Vide production, 2000
 Joseph of Nazareth, television film, Lux Vide production, originally aired on Mediaset, 2000
 Mary Magdalene, television film, Lux Vide production, originally aired on Mediaset, 2000
 Giuda, television film, Lux Vide production, originally aired on Mediaset, 2001
 Thomas, television film, Lux Vide production, originally aired on Mediaset, 2001
 The Apocalypse, television film, Lux Vide production, aired on RAI1, 2002
 Imperium: Saint Peter, television film, Lux Vide production, aired on RAI 1, 2005
 Karol: The Pope, The Man, television film, Tao Due production, aired on Mediaset, 2005
 Maria Montessori – Una vita per i bambini, television film, Tao Due production, aired on Mediaset, 2007; "Maximo Award" at the Roma Fiction Fest for best screenplay
 Paul VI: The Pope in the Tempest, television film, Lux Vide production, aired on RAI 1, 2008
 Francesco, television film, aired on RAI 1, 2014

Bibliography

References

External links
   Gianmario Pagano worldcat.org
 
 Roma Fiction Fest
 YouTube channel Bella, prof!
  Blog Bella, prof!

Clergy from Rome
Italian screenwriters
1962 births
Living people